R. Arokiaraj is a Carrom champion from Chennai, Tamil Nadu, India. Arokiaraj was a city carrom champion.

He has won many international and national Carrom competitions.

International Championships
 Champion, Doubles title with A. Maria Irudayam, First World Carrom Championship (1991) at New Delhi, India.
 Runner-up, Singles title, First World Carrom Championship (1991) at New Delhi, India.
 Member of the Indian team that won the Team Event at the First World Carrom Championship (1991) at New Delhi, India.
 Champion, Singles title, First International Triangular Invitation Carrom Tournament (1991) at Male, Maldives.
 Runner-up, Singles title, Second World Carrom Championship (1995) at Colombo, Sri Lanka.
 Runner-up, Doubles title with A. Maria Irudayam, Second World Carrom Championship (1995) at Colombo, Sri Lanka.
 Member of the Indian team that won the Team Event at the Second World Carrom Championship (1995) at Colombo, Sri Lanka.
 Champion, Singles title, First Malaysian Open International Carrom Tournament (1999) at Kuala Lumpur, Malaysia.
 Member of the Indian team that won the Team Event at the First Malaysian Open International Carrom Tournament (1999) at Kuala Lumpur, Malaysia.
 Champion, Mixed Doubles with G. Revathay, fourth SAARC Carrom Championship (2000) at Male, Maldives.
 Runner-up, Singles title, fourth SAARC Carrom Championship (2000) at Male, Maldives.
 Member of the Indian team that won the Team Event at the Fourth SAARC Carrom Championship (2000) at Male, Maldives.

References

External links
 R. Arokiaraj - Carrom Championship, Archived at the Internet Archive

Tamil sportspeople
Indian carrom players
Living people
Year of birth missing (living people)
Place of birth missing (living people)
Game players from Tamil Nadu